Backstage most commonly refers to backstage (theatre), also in motion picture and television production.

Backstage may also refer to:

Film and television
Back Stage (1969 film), a silent film starring Oliver Hardy
Back Stage (1942 film), a silent film starring Buster Keaton
Back Stage (1921 film), a silent Our Gang short
Backstage (1927 film), a silent comedy feature starring William Collier Jr. and Barbara Bedford
Limelight (1936 film), a British musical also known as Backstage
Backstage (1939 film), an Italian comedy film
Backstage (1988 film), an Australian film
Backstage (2000 film), a rap concert documentary
Backstage (2005 film), a French film directed by Emmanuelle Bercot
Backstage (South African TV series), a 2000–2007 South African youth-targeted soap opera television series
Backstage (Canadian TV series), a 2016–2017 Canadian television drama series about a performing arts high school that aired on Family Channel

Other
Backstage (album), by Cher
Backstage (magazine), an entertainment-industry brand that publishes Backstage magazine, Call Sheet, and Backstage.com
Backstage View, a feature of Microsoft Office, starting with Microsoft Office 2010

See also
 Behind the Scenes (disambiguation)
Clown alley, a backstage area of a circus